The 1976 Harvard Crimson football team was an American football team that represented Harvard University during the 1976 NCAA Division I football season. Harvard tied for third place in the Ivy League.

In their sixth year under head coach Joe Restic, the Crimson compiled a 6–3 record and outscored opponents 176 to 115. William D. Emper was the team captain.

Harvard's 4–3  conference record tied for third in the Ivy League standings. The Crimson outscored Ivy opponents 115 to 88.

Harvard played its home games at Harvard Stadium in the Allston neighborhood of Boston, Massachusetts.

Schedule

References

Harvard
Harvard Crimson football seasons
Harvard Crimson football
Harvard Crimson football